Gerosis bhagava, also known as the common yellow-breast flat, is a species of butterfly in the family Hesperiidae.

Distribution
It is found in India, Nepal, Bhutan, Bangladesh, Cambodia and Myanmar.

Description
In 1865, Frederic Moore described this butterfly as:

Life history
The larvae feed on Dalbergia lanceolaria.

References

External links
 Photo
 Japanese butterflies
 ToL web

Tagiadini
Butterflies of Asia
Butterflies of Indochina